The Queen's Bridge is a historic road bridge over the Yarra River in Melbourne, Victoria, Australia. The bridge was built in 1889 and has five wrought iron plate girder spans, and is listed on the Victorian Heritage Register. The bridge was built by contractor David Munro, and replaced a timber footbridge built in 1860.

The bridge is a very flat arch, and has five spans constructed of wrought iron plate girders. The bridge rests on iron cylinders filled with concrete, in groups of eight, with arched bracing between. It connects Market Street and William Street on the north bank to Queensbridge Street to the south. Trams on route 58 also cross the bridge.

In 1910, Houdini leapt from the bridge while shackled and escaped in less than one minute.

Yarra Falls

Queens Bridge marks the location of the Yarra Falls, a waterfall that had existed on the Yarra River. The Aboriginal clans of Woiwurrung and Boon wurrung called the falls Yarra Yarra and used it as a crossing point between their lands. 

In June 1835 John Batman arrived at Yarra Falls and recognised the surrounding land as a good site to build a village. The site became the landing spot for ships in Melbourne, because the falls had prevented ships from travelling further upstream, which influenced the overall design of Melbourne.

In 1839 a dam was built upon the falls using convict labour in order to secure the fresh water supply for the growing city, but did not last long, nor did its replacement. In 1845 a bridge was built at the site by a private company, but this was replaced by a government funded Prince's Bridge in 1850, which was to stand until the demolition of the Falls.

References 

Bridges in Melbourne
Plate girder bridges
Arch bridges in Australia
Bridges over the Yarra River
Heritage-listed buildings in Melbourne
1889 establishments in Australia
Bridges completed in 1889
Buildings and structures in the City of Melbourne (LGA)
Transport in the City of Melbourne (LGA)
Southbank, Victoria